The Battle of Cowpens was an engagement during the American Revolutionary War fought on January 17, 1781 near the town of Cowpens, South Carolina, between U.S. forces under Brigadier General Daniel Morgan and British forces under Lieutenant Colonel Banastre Tarleton, as part of the campaign in the Carolinas (North and South). The battle was a turning point in the American reconquest of South Carolina from the British.

Morgan's forces conducted a double envelopment of Tarleton's forces, the only double envelopment of the war. Tarleton's force of 1000 British troops were set against 2000 troops under Morgan. Morgan's forces suffered casualties of only 25 killed and 124 wounded. Tarleton's force was almost completely eliminated with almost 30% casualties and 55% of his force captured or missing, with Tarleton himself and only about 200 British troops escaping.

A small force of the Continental Army under the command of Morgan had marched to the west of the Catawba River, in order to forage for supplies and raise the morale of local colonial sympathizers. The British had received incorrect reports that Morgan's army was planning to attack the important strategic fort of Ninety Six, held by American Loyalists to the British Crown and located in the west of the Carolinas. The British considered Morgan's army a threat to their left flank. General Charles Cornwallis dispatched cavalry (dragoons) commander Tarleton to defeat Morgan's command. Upon learning Morgan's army was not at Ninety Six, Tarleton, bolstered by British reinforcements, set off in hot pursuit of the American detachment.

Morgan resolved to make a stand near the Broad River. He selected a position on two low hills in open woodland, with the expectation that the aggressive Tarleton would make a headlong assault without pausing to devise a more intricate plan. He deployed his army in three main lines. Tarleton's army, after an exhausting march, reached the field malnourished and heavily fatigued. Tarleton attacked immediately; however, the American defense-in-depth absorbed the impact of the British attack. The British lines lost their cohesion as they hurried after the retreating Americans. When Morgan's army went on the offensive, it wholly overwhelmed Tarleton's force.

Tarleton's brigade was wiped out as an effective fighting force, and, coupled with the British defeat at the Battle of Kings Mountain in the northwest corner of South Carolina, this action compelled Cornwallis to pursue the main southern American army into North Carolina, leading to the Battle of Guilford Court House, and Cornwallis's eventual defeat at the siege of Yorktown in Virginia in October 1781.

Background
On October 14, 1780, Continental Army commander General George Washington chose Nathanael Greene, a Rhode Island Quaker officer, to be commander of the Southern Department of the Continental forces. Greene's task was not an easy one. In 1780 the Carolinas had been the scene of a long string of disasters for the Continental Army, the worst being the capture of one American army under Gen. Benjamin Lincoln in May 1780, at the siege of Charleston. The British then occupied the city, the largest in the South and the capital of South Carolina. Later that year, another Colonial army, commanded by General Horatio Gates, was defeated at the Battle of Camden. A victory of colonial militia over their Loyalist counterparts at the Battle of Kings Mountain on the northwest frontier in October had bought time, but most of South Carolina was still occupied by the British. When Greene took command, the southern army numbered 2307 men on paper (1482 present), of whom only 949 were Continental regulars, mostly of the famous and highly trained "Maryland Line" regiment.

On December 3, Brigadier General Daniel Morgan reported for duty to Greene's headquarters at Charlotte, North Carolina. At the start of the Revolution, Morgan, whose military experience dated to the French and Indian War (1754–1763), had served at the siege of Boston in 1775. Later he participated in the 1775 invasion of Canada and its climactic battle, the Battle of Quebec. That battle, on December 31, 1775, ended in defeat and Morgan's capture by the British.

Morgan was exchanged in January 1777 and placed by George Washington in command of a picked force of 500 trained riflemen, known as Morgan's Riflemen. Morgan and his men played a key role in the 1777 victory at Saratoga along the Hudson River in upstate New York, which proved to be a turning point of the entire war. Bitter after being passed over for promotion and plagued by severe attacks of sciatica, Morgan left the army in 1779. A year later, he was promoted to brigadier general and returned to service in the Southern Department.

Greene decided that his weak army could not meet the British in a stand-up fight. He made the unconventional decision to divide his army, sending a detachment west of the Catawba River to raise the morale of the locals and find supplies beyond the limited amounts available around Charlotte. Greene gave Morgan command of this wing and instructed him to join with the militia west of the Catawba and take command of them. Morgan headed west on December 21, charged with taking position between the Broad and Pacolet rivers and protecting the civilians in that area. He had 600 men, some 400 of whom were Continentals, mostly the Marylanders. The rest were Virginia militia who had experience as Continentals. By Christmas Day, Morgan had reached the Pacolet River. He was joined by 60 more South Carolina militiamen led by the experienced guerrilla partisan Andrew Pickens. Other militia from Georgia and the Carolinas joined Morgan's camp.

Meanwhile, Lord Cornwallis was planning to return to North Carolina and conduct the invasion that he had postponed after the defeat at Kings Mountain. Morgan's force represented a threat to his left. Additionally, Cornwallis received incorrect intelligence claiming that Morgan was going to attack the important British fort of American Loyalists at Ninety Six, in western South Carolina. Seeking to save the fort and defeat Morgan's command, Cornwallis on January 2 ordered cavalry (dragoons) Lieutenant Colonel Banastre Tarleton to the west.

Tarleton was 26 years old and had enjoyed a spectacular career in his service with the British in the colonies. In December 1776, he and a small party surprised and captured Colonial General Charles Lee in New Jersey. He served with distinction at the siege of Charleston and the Battle of Camden. Commanding the British Legion, a mixed infantry/cavalry force composed of American Loyalists who constituted some of the best British troops in the Carolinas, Tarleton won victories at Monck's Corner and Fishing Creek. He became infamous among colonists after his victory at the Battle of Waxhaws, where his men had killed American soldiers after they had surrendered. In Tarleton's account published in the British Isles in 1781, he said that his horse had been shot from under him during the initial charge and his men, thinking him dead, engaged in "a vindictive asperity not easily restrained".

Tarleton and the Legion marched to Ninety Six. After learning Morgan was not there, Tarleton asked for reinforcements of British regulars, which Cornwallis sent. Tarleton set out with his enlarged command to drive Morgan across the Broad River. On January 12 he received accurate news of Morgan's location and continued with hard marching, building boats to cross rivers that were flooding with winter rains. Receiving word that Tarleton was in hot pursuit, Morgan retreated north to avoid being trapped between Tarleton and Cornwallis.

By the afternoon of the 16th, Morgan was approaching the Broad River, which was high with flood waters and reported difficult to cross. He knew Tarleton was close behind. By nightfall, he had reached a place called locally "Hannah's Cowpens", a well-known grazing area for local cattle. Pickens, who had been patrolling, arrived that night to join Morgan with his large body of irregular militia. Morgan decided to stand and fight rather than continue to retreat and risk being caught by Tarleton while fording the Broad River. Learning of Morgan's location, Tarleton pushed his troops, marching at 3 a.m. instead of camping for the night.

Prelude

Continental force
The size of the American force at Cowpens remains in dispute. Morgan claimed in his official report to have had about 800 men at Cowpens, which is substantially supported by historian John Buchanan, whose estimate is between 800 and 1000 men. In contrast, historian Lawrence E. Babits, in his detailed study of the battle, estimates that the strength of Morgan's command on the day of the battle was closer to 1,900, composed of:
A battalion of Continental infantry under Lieutenant Colonel John Eager Howard of Baltimore, with one company from Delaware ("Delaware Line"), one from Virginia, and three from the famous stalwart "Maryland Line" regiment, each with a strength of sixty men (300)
A company of Virginia state militia troops under Captain John Lawson (75)
A company of South Carolina state troops under Captain Joseph Pickens (60)
A small company of North Carolina state troops under Captain Henry Connelly (number not given)
A Virginia militia battalion under Frank Triplett (160)
Three companies of Virginia militia under Major David Campbell (50)
A battalion of North Carolina militia under Colonel Joseph McDowell (260–285)
A brigade of four battalions of South Carolina militia under Colonel Andrew Pickens, comprising a three-company battalion of the Spartan Regiment under Lieutenant Colonel Benjamin Roebuck, a four-company battalion of the Spartan Regiment under Col. John Thomas, five companies of the Little River Regiment under Lieutenant Colonel Joseph Hayes, and seven companies of the Fair Forest Regiment under Col. Thomas Brandon. Babits states that this battalion "ranged in size from 120 to more than 250 men". If Roebuck's three companies numbered 120 and Brandon's seven companies numbered 250, then Thomas's four companies probably numbered about 160 and Hayes's five companies about 200, for a total of 730.
Three small companies of Georgia militia commanded by Major Cunningham who numbered 55
A detachment of the 1st and 3rd Continental Light Dragoons under Lieutenant Colonel William Washington (82), who was a second cousin of George Washington.
Detachments of state dragoons from North Carolina and Virginia (30)
A detachment of South Carolina state dragoons, with a few mounted Georgians, commanded by Major James McCall (25)
A company of newly raised volunteers from the local South Carolina militia commanded by Major Benjamin Jolly (45)

Babits's figures can be summarized as follows: 82 Continental light dragoons, 55 state dragoons, 45 militia dragoons, 300 Continental infantry, about 150 state infantry, and 1,255–1,280 militia infantry, for a total of 1,887–1,912 officers and men. Broken down by state, there were about 855 South Carolinians, 442 Virginians, 290–315 North Carolinians, 180 Marylanders, 60 Georgians, and 60 Delawareans.

Morgan's forces were strengthened by these core elements of relatively seasoned troops and his own brilliance in leadership. His Continentals were veterans (Marylanders from the 1776 Battle of Brooklyn), as were many of his militia, which included some Overmountain Men, who had fought at the Battle of Musgrove Mill and the Battle of Kings Mountain. The experienced British forces (and particularly their relatively young commander) were accustomed, especially in the Southern Theater, to easily routing often "green" militia, and could have underestimated the opposition.

British force
Tarleton's force included:
The British Legion: 250 cavalry and 200 infantry,
A troop of the 17th Light Dragoons (50),
A battery of the Royal Artillery (24) with two 3-pounder cannons
7th Regiment of Foot (Royal Fusiliers) (177)
Light infantry company of the 16th Regiment of Foot (42)
71st Regiment of Foot (Fraser's Highlanders) under Major Arthur MacArthur (334)
Light company of the Loyalist Prince of Wales's American Regiment (31)
A company of Loyalist guides (50)
A total of over 1,150 officers and men.

Broken down by troop classification, there were 300 cavalry, 553 regulars, 24 artillerymen, and 281 militia. From these numbers, nearly half of Tarleton's force were Loyalist troops recruited in the colonies (531 out of 1,158). Tarleton's regular troops from the Royal Artillery, 17th Light Dragoons, and the 7th, 16th, and 71st Regiments of Foot were reliable and seasoned soldiers. Tarleton's own Loyalist unit, the British Legion, had established a fierce reputation as formidable pursuers, being used to great effect at Waxhaws and Camden, but had an uncertain reputation when facing determined opposition.

Morgan's plan

Morgan turned to his advantage the terrain of Cowpens, the varying reliability of his troops, his expectations of his opponent, and the time available before Tarleton's arrival. He knew that untrained militiamen, which comprised a large portion of his force, were generally unreliable in a pitched battle, and in the past had routed at the first hint of defeat and abandoned the regulars. For instance, the Battle of Camden had ended in disaster when the militia, which comprised half of the American force, broke and ran as soon as the fighting started, leaving the American flank exposed. To eliminate that possibility, he defied convention by placing his army between the Broad and Pacolet rivers, thus making escape impossible if the army was routed. Selecting a low hill as the center of his position, he placed his Continental infantry on it, deliberately leaving his flanks exposed to his opponent. With a ravine on their right flank and a creek on their left flank, Morgan reasoned his forces were sufficiently protected against possible British flanking maneuvers at the beginning of the battle.

Morgan surmised that Tarleton would be highly confident and attack him head-on, without pausing to devise a more subtle plan. He therefore arranged his forces to encourage this presupposed impetuosity of his opponent by establishing three lines of soldiers: one of sharpshooters, one of militia, and a main line of regulars and experienced militia. The first line was composed of 150 select riflemen from North Carolina (Major McDowell) and Georgia (Major Cunningham). The second line consisted of 300 militiamen under the command of Colonel Andrew Pickens. The effect was the conspicuous placement of weak militia in the center-front in order to encourage Tarleton to attack there. The skirmishers and militia would screen the veteran Continental regulars, while inflicting casualties as the British advanced. Morgan asked the militia to fire two volleys, something they could do, and then withdraw to the left and re-form in the rear behind the third line, under the cover of reserve light dragoons commanded by Colonel William Washington and James McCall. The withdrawal of the militia was, in effect, a feigned retreat which would further embolden Tarleton. The third line, on the hill, was manned by Morgan's most seasoned troops: around 550 Continental regulars comprising Brooklyn veterans: the famed Maryland Line and Delaware Line, supported by experienced militiamen from Georgia and Virginia. Colonel John Eager Howard of Baltimore commanded the Continental regulars, while Colonels Tate and Triplett commanded the experienced militia. The third line could be expected to stand and hold against the British force. Morgan expected that the British advance uphill would be disorganized, weakened both physically and psychologically by the first two lines, before engaging the third. The third line would also withdraw a short distance to add to the appearance of a rout.

In developing his tactics at Cowpens, as historian John Buchanan wrote, Morgan may have been "the only general in the American Revolution, on either side, to produce a significant original tactical thought".

Tarleton's approach

At 2:00 a.m. on January 17, 1781, Tarleton roused his troops and continued his march to Cowpens. Lawrence Babits states that, "in the five days before Cowpens, the British were subjected to stress that could only be alleviated by rest and proper diet". He points out that "in the forty-eight hours before the battle, the British ran out of food and had less than four hours' sleep". Over the whole period, Tarleton's brigade did a great deal of rapid marching across difficult terrain. Babits concludes that they reached the battlefield exhausted and malnourished. Tarleton sensed victory and nothing would persuade him to delay. His Tory scouts had told him of the countryside Morgan was fighting on, and he was certain of success because Morgan's soldiers, mostly militiamen, seemed to be caught between mostly experienced British troops and a flooding river. As soon as he reached the spot, Tarleton formed a battle line, which consisted of dragoons on his flanks, with his two grasshopper cannons in between the British Regulars and American Loyalists.

Tarleton's plan was simple and direct. Most of his infantry (including that of the Legion) would be assembled in linear formation and move directly upon Morgan. The right and left flanks of this line would be protected by dragoon units. In reserve was the 250-man battalion of Scottish Highlanders (71st Regiment of Foot), commanded by Major Arthur MacArthur, a professional soldier of long experience who had served in the Dutch Scotch Brigade. Finally, Tarleton kept the 200-man cavalry contingent of his Legion ready to be unleashed when the Americans broke and ran.

Battle

A few minutes before sunrise, Tarleton's vanguard emerged from the woods in front of the American position. Tarleton ordered his dragoons to attack the first line of skirmishers, who opened fire and shot fifteen dragoons. When the dragoons promptly retreated, he immediately ordered an infantry charge, without pausing to study the American deployment or to allow the rest of his infantry and his cavalry reserve to make it out of the woods. Tarleton attacked the skirmish line without pausing, deploying his main body and his two grasshopper cannons. The American skirmishers kept firing as they withdrew to join the second line manned by Pickens's irregular militia. The British attacked again, this time reaching the militiamen, who (as ordered) poured two volleys into the enemy, especially targeting commanders. The British—with 40% of their casualties being officers—were astonished and confused. They reorganized and continued to advance. Tarleton ordered one of his officers, Ogilvie, to charge with some dragoons into the "defeated" Americans. His men moved forward in regular formation and were momentarily paused by the militia musket fire, but continued to advance. Pickens's militia seemed to "flee" as usual, around the American left to the rear as planned after getting off their second volley.

Taking the withdrawal of the first two lines as a full-blown retreat, the British advanced headlong into the third and final line of disciplined Maryland and Delaware regulars which awaited them on the hill. The 71st Highlanders were ordered to flank the American right. John Eager Howard spotted the flanking movement and ordered the Virginia militiamen manning the American right to turn and face the Scots. However, in the noise of battle, Howard's order was misunderstood and the militiamen began to withdraw. It was now 7:45 am, and the British had been fighting for nearly an hour. They were tired and disorganized, but they saw the Virginia militia on the rebels' right withdrawing and believed the Americans were on the run. They charged, breaking formation and advancing in a chaotic mass. Morgan ordered a volley. Howard's "fleeing" militia suddenly stopped their withdrawal and made an about-face. The Virginians fired into the British at a range of no more than thirty yards, with massive effect, causing the confused British to lurch to a halt. John Eager Howard shouted, "Charge bayonets!"

The Continentals in the center, as ordered, mounted a bayonet charge. Tarleton's force, faced with a terrible surprise, began to collapse; some men surrendering on the spot, while others turned and ran. Howard's men charged forward and seized the two British grasshopper cannons. William Washington's cavalry came around from behind the opposite American left to hit the British on their right flank and rear. Pickens's militia, having now reorganized, charged out from behind the hill, completing a 360-degree circle around the American position to hit the 71st Highlanders on the British left flank and rear. Howard ordered the Virginia militia, whose withdrawal had brought on the British ill-fated charge, to turn about and attack the Scots from the other direction.

The shock of the sudden charge, coupled with the reappearance of the American militiamen on the left flank where Tarleton's exhausted men expected to see their own cavalry, proved too much for the British. Nearly half of the British and Loyalist infantrymen fell to the ground whether they were wounded or not. Their will to fight was gone. Historian Lawrence Babits diagnoses "combat shock" as the cause for this abrupt British collapse—the effects of exhaustion, hunger, and demoralization suddenly catching up with them. Caught in a clever double envelopment that has been compared with the Battle of Cannae in ancient times, many of the British surrendered.

When Tarleton's right flank and center line collapsed, only a minority of the 71st Highlanders were putting up a fight against part of Howard's line. Tarleton, realizing how desperate his situation was, rode back to his sole remaining intact unit, the British Legion cavalry. He ordered them to charge, but they instead fled the field. The Highlanders, surrounded by militia and Continentals, surrendered. Desperate to save something, Tarleton found about forty cavalrymen and with them tried to retrieve his two cannons, but they had been captured, and he too retreated from the field. Although their charge was initially effective, the dragoons, numbering about 50, were quickly surprised and outnumbered by concealed American cavalry, under Colonel William Washington, and driven back in disarray. Washington was in close pursuit of the retreating Tarleton and found himself somewhat isolated. He was attacked by the British commander and two of his men. Tarleton was stopped by Washington himself, who attacked him with his sword, calling out, "Where is now the boasting, Tarleton?" A cornet of the 17th, Thomas Patterson, rode up to strike Washington, but was shot by Washington's orderly trumpeter. Washington survived this assault and in the process wounded Tarleton on his right hand with a sabre blow, while Tarleton creased Washington's knee with a pistol shot that also wounded his horse. It was now 8:00 a.m., and the battle had lasted approximately one hour. Washington pursued Tarleton for sixteen miles, but gave up the chase when he came to the plantation of local planter Adam Goudylock near Thicketty Creek. Tarleton was able to escape capture by forcing Goudylock to serve as guide.

Aftermath

Morgan's army took 712 prisoners, which included 200 wounded. Even worse for the British, the forces lost (especially the British Legion and the dragoons) constituted the cream of Cornwallis's army. Additionally, 110 British soldiers were killed in action, and every artilleryman was either killed or incapacitated by wounds. Tarleton suffered an 86 percent casualty rate, and his brigade had been wiped out as a fighting force. John Eager Howard quoted Major McArthur of the 71st Highlanders, now a prisoner of the Americans, as saying that "he was an officer before Tarleton was born; that the best troops in the service were put under 'that boy' to be sacrificed." An American prisoner later recounted that when Tarleton reached Cornwallis and reported the disaster, Cornwallis placed his sword tip on the ground and leaned on it until the blade snapped.

Historian Lawrence E. Babits has demonstrated that Morgan's official report of 73 casualties appears to have only included his Continental troops. From surviving records, he has been able to identify by name 128 Colonial soldiers who were either killed or wounded at Cowpens. He also presents an entry in the North Carolina State Records that shows 68 Continental and 80 militia casualties. It would appear that both the number of Morgan's casualties and the total strength of his force were about double what he officially reported.

Tarleton's apparent recklessness in pushing his command so hard in pursuit of Morgan may be explained by the fact that, up until Cowpens, every battle that he and his British Legion had fought in the South had been a relatively easy victory. He appears to have been so concerned with pursuing Morgan that he quite forgot that it was necessary for his men to be in a fit condition to fight once they caught him, though Cornwallis himself did press Tarleton to take aggressive action.

Coming in the wake of the American debacle at Camden, Cowpens was a surprising victory and a turning point that affected the psychology of the entire war—"spiriting up the people", not only those of the backcountry Carolinas, but those in all the Southern states. As it was, the Americans were encouraged to fight further, and the Loyalists and British were demoralized. Furthermore, its strategic result—the destruction of an important part of the British army in the South—was crucial toward ending the war. Along with the British defeat at the Battle of Kings Mountain, Cowpens was a serious blow to Cornwallis, who might have defeated much of the remaining resistance in South Carolina had Tarleton won at Cowpens. Instead, the battle set in motion a series of events leading to the end of the war. Cornwallis abandoned his pacification efforts in South Carolina, stripped his army of its excess baggage, and pursued Greene's force into North Carolina. Skirmishes occurred at the Catawba River (February 1, 1781) and other fords. Yet, after a long chase Cornwallis met Greene at the Battle of Guilford Court House, winning a pyrrhic victory that so weakened his army that he withdrew to Yorktown, Virginia, to rest and refit. Washington and his French ally, Rochambeau, seized this opportunity to trap and defeat him in the Battle of Yorktown, which caused the British to give up their efforts to defeat the Americans.

In the opinion of John Marshall, "Seldom has a battle, in which greater numbers were not engaged, been so important in its consequences as that of Cowpens." It gave General Nathanael Greene his chance to conduct a campaign of "dazzling shiftiness" that led Cornwallis by "an unbroken chain of consequences to the catastrophe at Yorktown which finally separated America from the British crown".

Memorials
 The battle site is preserved at Cowpens National Battlefield.
The Daniel Morgan Monument is in downtown Spartanburg.
 Two ships of the U.S. Navy have been named USS Cowpens in honor of the battle.
 Three current Army National Guard units (116th Inf, 175th Inf, and 198th Sig Bn) are derived from American units that participated in the Battle of Cowpens. There are only thirty Army National Guard and active Regular Army units with lineages that go back to the colonial era.

The battle in film
 The final battle at the end of the 2000 film The Patriot drew its inspiration from two specific battles from the American Revolution: Cowpens and Guilford Courthouse. The Americans used the same basic tactics in both battles. The name of the battle, as well as the winning side, were taken from the Cowpens battle. The size of the armies, as well as the presence of Generals Nathanael Greene and Lord Cornwallis, came from the Guilford Courthouse battle.
 The movie Sweet Liberty, directed by Alan Alda, parodies how a film company takes great liberty with the depiction of the Battle of Cowpens.

See also
 American Revolutionary War § War in the South. Places ' Battle of Cowpens ' in overall sequence and strategic context.

Notes

References
 
 
 
 
 
 
 
 
Montross, Lynn. "America's Most Imitated Battle." American Heritage, Vol. 7, No. 3 (April 1956), pp. 35–37, 100–101.
 
 
 
 
 
 Ward, Christopher. War of the Revolution 2 Volumes, MacMillan, New York, 1952

External links
 
 
 Montross, Lynn (April 1956). "America's Most Imitated Battle." American Heritage, Vol. 7, No. 3 (April 1956), pp. 35–37, 100–101.
 
 
 

1781 in South Carolina
1781 in the United States
Cowpens
Cherokee County, South Carolina
Cowpens
Cowpens
Cowpens